Aqua Lung International (formerly La Spirotechnique) is a large and well-known firm which makes scuba and other self-contained breathing apparatus, and other diving equipment. It produced the Aqua-Lung line of regulators, like the CG45 (1945) and the Mistral (1955), among others. Until 2016, the company was a division of Air Liquide since its foundation in 1946. The company was sold to Montagu Private Equity in 2016.

History 
In December 1942 the lieutenant de vaisseau (ship-of-the-Line Lieutenant) Jacques-Yves Cousteau met in Paris for the first time the engineer Émile Gagnan, employee at Air Liquide, a French company specialising in compressed gas. Because of severe fuel restrictions due to the German occupation of France, Gagnan had miniaturized and adapted to gas generators a Rouquayrol-Denayrouze-type regulator. Invented in 1860, adapted to diving in 1864 and mass-produced as of 1865 (when the Ministry of the French Navy ordered the first apparati), the Rouquayrol-Denayrouze regulator was being commercialized in 1942 by the Bernard Piel Company, who had inherited the patent. Cousteau requested Gagnan to adapt his new own regulator to diving and both men patented in 1943 the first modern diving regulator.

Early in 1943 Cousteau and Gagnan ordered Air Liquide to make at its factory in Boulogne-Billancourt two scuba set prototypes that Cousteau and Frédéric Dumas used to shoot the underwater film Épaves (Shipwrecks), directed by Cousteau the same year. They were the first modern diving regulators to be made.

In 1946 Air Liquide founded La Spirotechnique, its own division destined to conceive and mass-produce regulators and other diving equipment. Also in 1946 La Spirotechnique launched the CG45, the first modern regulator to be commercialized. The year 1946 represents thus the beginning of the popularisation of scuba diving.

In English-speaking countries the CG45 was commercialized under the name of Aqua-Lung, a word coined by Cousteau himself on that purpose.

In the USA during World War II the American military physician Christian J. Lambertsen designed a wartime frogman's rebreather which in 1952 got called the SCUBA (acronym for Self-Contained Underwater Breathing Apparatus), and later the name (changing to 'scuba' and treated as a word) was used to mean any underwater breathing set.

In Britain the word "aqualung" became a generic trademark for open-circuit underwater breathing sets and stayed so for many years. The word "scuba" became the generic word quickly in the US and eventually in Britain. For more information see Aqua-lung#Trademark issues.

From 1946 to 1955 La Spirotechnique sold only one model of regulator, the CG45.

In April 1955 it launched the Mistral, a single-stage regulator that was cheaper to build and easier to breathe than the CG45. The Mistral became the brands spearhead and set off to establish scuba diving across the world. The CG45 and the Mistral were twin-hose regulators, but La Spirotechnique wanted to create a single-hose regulator, to let divers exchange their mouthpieces in narrow underwater caves and hollows, not knowing that in 1952 the Australian Ted Eldred had started to sell the first single-hose regulator, the Porpoise.

In 1955 La Spirotechnique launched its first single hose regulator. Conceived by Jean Bronnec and Raymond Gauthier this regulator was the Cristal, called the Aquamatic for English-speaking countries.

The first American branch of La Spirotechnique was U.S. Divers Company, which first sold aqualungs (CG45, Mistral), Aquamatic (Cristal) and other La Spirotechnique regulators in the United States. At some point La Spirotechnique used the word Aqua Lung to change its name, or to use it as an alternate name. Nowadays U.S. Divers Company is known as Aqua Lung America. Aqua Lung/La Spirotechnique sits nowadays in Carros, near Nice and owns its own international branches around the world, like Aqua Lung America.

Spirotechnique produced the DC55 passive addition sem-closed rebreather.

Brands and associated product lines 
 Squale 
 Apeks 
 Aqua Lung
 Deep See 
 Gorski 
 SeaQuest 
 Technisub 
 U.S. Divers 
 Whites

Companies
 Apeks Marine Equipment Ltd.
 G2000SS, Inc.
 Pelagic Pressure Systems
 White's Manufacturing Ltd.

References

External links
http://frogmanmuseum.free.fr/html/regulatorslaspirotechniqueen.htm Images of Spirotechnique aqualung demand valves

Diving engineering
Diving equipment manufacturers